The Westminster Chorus (formerly known as the Harmony Showcase Chorus) is a men's a cappella chorus based in Westminster, California. International Chorus Champions of the Barbershop Harmony Society in 2007, 2010, 2015, and 2019, and Choir of the World in 2009, they are composed almost entirely of men under the age of 40.

History

The town of Westminster, in Orange County, California has supported a barbershop chapter for almost half a century;  but by the 1990s, it had an aging membership and no active performing chorus.  In 2002 a small group of younger men from the Masters of Harmony chorus in nearby Santa Fe Springs, CA decided they would like to try to start a barbershop chorus with the mission of bringing younger men together to make music with others their own age.  Founding member Terry Ghiselli approached the men of the Westminster chapter, which at the time only comprised 8 members, and they were glad to allow the young men to pick up and use the chapter charter in order to produce their vision of a youth-oriented chorus.

With 15 members and only a half dozen rehearsals under their belt, they competed at the SoCal West divisional contest in April 2002.  The oldest member on stage was 27, the youngest 16.  The average age was 20, and 6 of the singers were brand new barbershoppers.  Directed by Ghiselli, they surprised the crowd by walking away with the championship trophy that day, and advancing to the Far Western District contest the following fall.

In October 2002, they traveled to Bakersfield, CA to compete in their first district contest, with 19 men.  They shocked the crowd by outscoring all other competitors, but were unfortunately disqualified from the championship because of a member eligibility issue.  The San Jose, CA Garden City Chorus was given the crown and advanced to the 2003 International contest in Montreal, Quebec, Canada.

In the fall of 2003 they once again competed at the Far Western District contest in Bakersfield and once again won the contest, this time legally, and by quite a margin, outscoring the second place Pacific Coast Harmony from La Jolla, CA by 53 points.  This gave them the right to represent FWD at the 2004 International contest in Louisville, Kentucky the following July, where they surprised the crowd by placing 9th the first time out.

The chorus voted to lay out of the 2004 fall district contest to pay homage to the 5-time International Champion Masters of Harmony, who were again eligible to win the right to defend their title in the summer of 2005 in Salt Lake City, where they won their 6th gold medal in a row.  Many of the men of Westminster were on stage as members of the Masters as well, including most of the original handful of Masters teens who had founded Westminster.

The fall of 2005 brought the Westminster Chorus back to the district contest, defending their title against a stronger field, which included the newly minted Spirit of Phoenix chorus (a merger of the Phoenix-Saguaro Phoenicians Chorus and the Greater Phoenix chapter) that boasted over 100 members.  But once again, quality won out over numbers, and the Westminster Chorus emerged victorious with less than 50 men singing.  Their outstanding score average of 87.7% gave them the third highest preliminary ranking internationally.

Under the direction of Royce Ferguson, they represented the FWD again in contest in July 2006 in Indianapolis, IN, where they placed second and won their first chorus medal, silver. The chorus was then said to be the youngest ever to have competed in the contest. The Vocal Majority chorus from Dallas won gold, continuing their streak of international championships.

In 2007 they auditioned on the second season of the TV show America's Got Talent in Chicago, aired June 19, and were passed to go to the second round by all three judges, but were eliminated at the first cut of the second round.

In July 2007 the chorus competed again in the international contest, again under the direction of Royce Ferguson, winning a gold medal.  They tied with the Ambassadors of Harmony in overall score, and won on the singing category tiebreaker. They became the youngest chorus ever to win a gold medal.

In 2009, under the new direction of Justin Miller, 35 members of Westminster Chorus took on a bunch of much older directors with much longer resumes and were the overall winners of prestigious Llangollen International Musical Eisteddfod 2009, where about 4,000 singers and dancers from 50 nations competed.  They were consistently introduced as a barbershop chorus (and the winners of the festival's "Barbershop Choruses" competition, but they performed impressive classical pieces as well). After winning the "barbershop chorus" and "folk song choirs" competitions earlier in the week, Westminster took a close second place in the "male choir" competition. In the final competition, they performed the same two numbers that had earned them second place and this time beat all others to win the Pavarotti trophy.

In 2010, the chorus competed at the International Chorus Championships in Philadelphia and earned their second gold medal with a score of 97.7%, at that time the highest chorus score ever obtained.

In 2013, the chorus competed at the chorus competition at the Society's international convention in Toronto. Westminster placed second after a narrow two-point defeat by the Toronto Northern Lights.

In October 2014, the chorus once again won the Far Western District championship in Fresno, CA and qualified in first place to the 2015 BHS International Quartet Contest in Pittsburgh, Pennsylvania.

In July 2015, the chorus competed at the Barbershop Harmony Society International Chorus Championships and earned their third gold medal, scoring an average of 97.5%, the third-highest score in contest history.

In 2018, the chorus competed at the International Chorus Championships in Orlando. Westminster was defeated by Vocal Majority and placed second.

In 2019, the chorus returned to the International stage with 100 singers, and won the gold medal with an overall score of 97.9%: the chorus's best ever score and the highest in BHS Contest history. This performance was the international arranging debut for their musical director, Justin Miller, who arranged the first song in the chorus's set: "I'll Be Here" from The Wild Party. Returning International Champions Ambassadors of Harmony came in 2nd place with 96.5%, and Swedish chorus Zero8 came in 3rd with 95.6%.

References

External links
 

Choirs in California
Barbershop Harmony Society choruses
America's Got Talent contestants
A cappella musical groups
People from Westminster, California
Musical groups established in 2002
2002 establishments in California
Boys' and men's choirs